Lionel Edmund Rose MBE (21 June 1948 – 8 May 2011) was an Australian professional boxer who competed from 1964 to 1976. He held the undisputed WBA, WBC, and The Ring bantamweight titles from 1968 to 1969, becoming the first Indigenous Australian to win a world title. He later became the first Indigenous Australian to be named Australian of the Year.

Rose was the 2003 inductee for the Australian National Boxing Hall of Fame "moderns" category and was the second person to be elevated to "legend" status in 2010.

Background
Born and raised at Jacksons Track in Victoria as well as the town of Warragul, Rose grew up in hardship and learned to box from his father, Roy, who was a skilled fighter at local house shows. Rose was of the Gunditjmara (Dhauwurd Wurrung) people.

Later, at the age of 10, Rose was given a pair of boxing gloves by his teacher, Ian Hawkins (who observed him shadow boxing). Aged about 15, he went under the tutelage of Frank Oakes, a Warragul trainer (whose daughter Jenny he later married). He won the Australian amateur flyweight title at 15. He was the godfather to model and actress Ruby Rose.

Professional boxing career

After missing selection for the 1964 Olympic Games in Tokyo, Rose began his professional boxing career at age 16, on 9 September 1964, outpointing Mario Magriss over eight rounds. This fight was in Warragul, but the majority of Rose's fights were held in Melbourne. Along the way he was helped by Jack and Shirley Rennie, in whose Melbourne home he stayed, training every day in their backyard gym.

After five wins in a row, on 23 July 1965, Rose was rematched with Singtong Por Tor, whom he had beaten in a 12-round decision. Por Tor inflicted Rose's first defeat, beating him on points in six rounds. On 14 October of the same year, he had his first fight abroad, beating Laurie Ny by a decision in 10 rounds at Christchurch, New Zealand.

Over his next nine fights, Rose had a record of eight wins and one loss, with one knockout. The lone loss in those nine fights was to Ray Perez, against whom Rose split a pair of bouts. Then at age 18, on 28 October 1966, he met Noel Kunde at Melbourne for the Australian bantamweight title. He won the title by defeating Kunde in a 15-round decision.

Rose won one more bout in 1966 and eight in 1967 (including a thirteenth-round knockout win against Rocky Gattellari to defend his Australian championship) before challenging Fighting Harada for the world bantamweight title on 26 February 1968 in Tokyo. Rose made history by becoming the first Aboriginal Australian to be a world champion boxer when he defeated Harada in a 15-round decision. This win made Rose an instant national hero in Australia and an icon among Aboriginal Australians. A public reception at Melbourne Town Hall was witnessed by a crowd of more than 10,000. On 2 July of that year, he returned to Tokyo to retain his title with a 15-round decision win over Takao Sakurai. Then, on 6 December, he met Chucho Castillo at the Inglewood Forum in Inglewood, California. Rose beat Castillo by decision, but the points verdict in favour of him infuriated many in the pro-Castillo crowd and a riot began: 14 fans and fight referee Dick Young were hospitalised for injuries received.

On 8 March 1969, Rose retained the title with a 15-round decision over Alan Rudkin, but five months later he returned to Inglewood, where he faced Rubén Olivares on 22 August. Rose lost the world bantamweight title to Olivares via a fifth-round knockout.

Rose continued boxing after his defeat against Olivares, but, after defeats against practically unknown fighters, many believed he was done as a prime fighter. However, he was far from finished: he upset future world lightweight champion Itshimatsu Suzuki on 10 October 1970 in a 10-round decision, and once again, he positioned himself as a world title challenger, albeit in the lightweight division, 17 pounds over the division where he crowned himself world champion.

Despite having lost to Jeff White for the Australian lightweight title, Rose got another world title try when he faced WBC world junior lightweight champion Yoshiaki Numata, on 30 May 1971 at Hiroshima. Numata beat Rose by a fifteen-round decision, and Rose announced his retirement soon after.

In 1975, he came back, but after losing four of his next six bouts, including one against Rafael Limón, Rose decided to retire for good. Rose compiled a record of 42 wins and 11 losses as a professional boxer, with 12 wins by knockout.

Singing career
During his time off from boxing in the 1970s, Rose embarked on a modest singing career in Australia having hits with "I Thank You" and "Please Remember Me" in 1970. Produced and written by Johnny Young and engineered by John L Sayers, the song "I Thank You" was a top 5 nationwide hit. Comedic sports commentators Roy Slaven and H.G. Nelson played it as a substitute to the Australian national anthem during radio broadcasts of the State of Origin series and other sporting events.

It is widely thought that Rose's singing career didn't give him time to get enough preparation training in, which is why he lost bouts against so many unknown fighters (after his loss to Ruben Olivares).

Rose sang "Jackson Track" and "I Thank You", in both the SBS documentary and accompanying CD, Buried Country: The Story of Aboriginal Country Music.

Studio albums

Singles

Retirement

In retirement, Rose became a successful businessman, and he enjoyed the monetary benefits his career brought him. Rose was showcased in 2002 in The Ring section 'Where are they now?'.

In 2007, Rose suffered a stroke that left him with speech and movement difficulties.

Rose died on 8 May 2011 after an illness which lasted for several months.

Awards
Rose was featured in Australian author: Wendy Lewis's book of "Australia's Greatest People" in 2010.

In 1968 Lionel Rose became the first Aboriginal Australian of the Year and was appointed a Member of the Order of the British Empire (MBE) in the Birthday Honours List for services to sport.

In 1969 Lionel Rose was granted the "Key to the City of Gold Coast", only the second recipient of the City's highest honor.

In the 1960s, he won the Australian Amateur Flyweight title

In 2003 he was an inaugural inductee in the Australian National Boxing Hall of Fame.

In 2005 he was featured on a stamp (part of the 2005 edition).

In 2005 Rose was also awarded the E9 title of 'King of the Ring'.

In 2011 he was inducted to the Victorian Aboriginal Honour Roll.

TV and film
His life inspired the TV serial The Battlers (1968) about an Aboriginal boxer, played by Vincent Gill in blackface.

The TV miniseries Rose Against the Odds was produced in 1991 – a period drama of Rose's life story starring Paul Williams and Telly Savalas. It was released as a feature film in 1995.

In 2008, after nearly three years of conducting interviews with Rose, his family and friends, Melbourne filmmaker Eddie Martin premiered his feature-length documentary Lionel at the Melbourne International Film Festival. After a brief theatrical run, a shorter version of the film premiered on SBS television on 28 November 2008.

Professional boxing record

See also
 List of bantamweight boxing champions
 List of WBA world champions
 List of WBC world champions
 List of The Ring world champions
 List of undisputed boxing champions

References

Further reading

External links
 
 Lionel Rose's Musical Legacy at Your Daily Spa.
 Recording of Lionel Rose winning the World Title in 1968 on australianscreen online. Commentary by Ron Casey.
 IMDB: Rose against the odds – TV movie
 Bill Long presents Lionel Rose in his first featherweight bout against Vicente Garcia featherweight champion of Mexico (1969)
 Aboriginal boxer Lionel Rose dies, aged 62. Aboriginal boxer Lionel Rose dies, aged 62 World Socialist Web Site (2011)
 
 Lionel Rose - CBZ Profile

|-

|-

|-

|-

1948 births
2011 deaths
Australian of the Year Award winners
Bantamweight boxers
World boxing champions
World bantamweight boxing champions
World Boxing Association champions
World Boxing Council champions
Indigenous Australian boxers
Australian Members of the Order of the British Empire
Sportsmen from Victoria (Australia)
Commonwealth Boxing Council champions
Australian male boxers
People from Warragul
Australian republicans
Sport Australia Hall of Fame inductees
20th-century Australian male singers